The 2001 European Nations Cup was the second annual competition for tier 2 and 3 European rugby union nations. The competition was originally planned to continue on an annual basis like the Six Nations but at the end of the season it was decided to change to a two-year cycle allowing home and away games.

The results of this season were added to the 2001–02 European Nations Cup First Division standings. Georgia won their first ever European Championship, which was overshadowed slightly by Romania winning the extended championship the following year. Morocco no longer would be taking part in this competition and were replaced by Russia.

Table

Matches

Week 1

Week 2

Week 3

Week 4

Week 5

See also
 2001 European Nations Cup Second Division
 2003 Rugby World Cup – European qualification

External links
2000-01 European Nations Cup First Division at ESPN

2000–01
2000–01 in European rugby union
2000–01 in Spanish rugby union
2001 in Russian rugby union
2001 in Georgian sport
2001 in Dutch sport
2000–01 in Romanian rugby union
2001 in Portuguese sport